The Benito roundleaf bat (Hipposideros beatus) is a species of bat in the family Hipposideridae found in Cameroon, Central African Republic, Republic of the Congo, Democratic Republic of the Congo, Ivory Coast, Equatorial Guinea, Gabon, Ghana, Guinea, Liberia, Nigeria, Sierra Leone, South Sudan, and Togo. Its natural habitat is subtropical or tropical moist lowland forests.

Taxonomy
The Benito roundleaf bat was described as a new species in 1906 by Danish mammalogist Knud Andersen. The holotype was collected  from the Benito River by American naturalist George Latimer Bates. Two subspecies are recognized: H. b. beatus and H. b. maximus.

Description
It has fine, fluffy, dark brown hair.

Biology and ecology
It is monoestrous, with one breeding season per year. Mating occurs in June and July (the end of the first wet season; females give birth in October and November (the middle of the second wet season). The litter size is one offspring.

Range and habitat
The Benito roundleaf bat has been documented in several countries in Africa, mainly in Central Africa. Its range includes: Cameroon, Republic of the Congo, The Democratic Republic of the Congo, Côte d'Ivoire, Equatorial Guinea, Gabon, Ghana, Guinea, Liberia, Nigeria, Sierra Leone, Sudan, and Togo.

Conservation
As of 2017, the Benito roundleaf bat is classified as a least-concern species by the IUCN.

References

Hipposideros
Mammals described in 1906
Taxa named by Knud Andersen
Bats of Africa
Taxonomy articles created by Polbot